Ye Olde Dolphin Inne is a Grade II listed pub, on Queen Street, in the city of Derby, England.

It is on the Campaign for Real Ale's National Inventory of Historic Pub Interiors.

It was built in the late 16th century, with the licence said to date from 1580, and is the oldest pub in Derby. The timber-framed exterior of the building was remodeled in the early 20th century. The pub appears on the 1620 map of John Speed.

The 18th-century extension, on the left-hand side of the building in Full Street, was originally a doctor's house, wherein he dissected the bodies of criminals who had been hanged.

References

External links

Grade II listed buildings in Derby
Grade II listed pubs in Derbyshire
National Inventory Pubs
Timber framed buildings in England